Night in Paradise is a 2020 South Korean crime drama film written and directed by Park Hoon-jung, starring Uhm Tae-goo, Jeon Yeo-been and Cha Seung-won. It had its world premiere on September 3, 2020, at the 77th Venice International Film Festival and was released on April 9, 2021 on Netflix.

Plot 

A mobster named Tae-gu is offered a chance to switch sides with his rival Bukseong gang, headed by Chairman Doh. Tae-gu rejects the offer that results in the murder of his sister and niece. In revenge, Tae-gu brutally kills Chairman Doh and his men and flees to Jeju Island until he can move out of the country to Russia where he meets Jae-yeon, a terminally ill woman and her arms dealer uncle, Kuto. Tae-gu's boss, Chairman Yang conducts an attack to wipe out the remaining Bukseong Gang's lieutenants to finally end the gang forever but without Tae-gu's leadership and efficiency, along with the revelation of Chairman Doh's survival, the plan failed. One of the top brass of Bukseong gang, Executive Ma, is mercilessly hunting Tae-gu to take revenge. Yang is forced to betray Tae-gu to save his life by choosing to hand him to the Bukseong gang. He also calls Tae-gu in Jeju, feigning a desire to escape to Russia with him in a week's time.

Kuto later on is killed during a firefight against his buyers who want to go against the weapon deal on the orders of Bukseong and the buyers are killed by Tae-gu and Jae-yeon. They then go on the run, crashing at a motel, where they commiserate on their misfortunes over alcohol.

Later on, Tae-gu arrives at the airport to meet his boss as planned. He unexpectedly receives a call from one of his underlings, Jin-sung (who he had previously failed to contact) revealing Yang's betrayal. Tae-gu is spotted by the gangsters leading to a prolonged chase in which he escapes. He heads back to the motel, finding Jae-yeon missing. She is revealed to be held hostage by Director Ma, who gives Tae-gu an hour to arrive.

Tae-gu indeed arrives and is subject to brutal torture under Ma's men. Ma reveals the truth: the killing of Tae-gu's sister and niece was ordered by Chairman Yang, who feared Tae-gu crossing over, along with all of his underlings, leaving him powerless. Enraged, Tae-gu attacks Yang, but is finally held back and finally stabbed to death by Ma's men, with the killing blow dealt by Yang. Jae-yoon, who could only watch the events unfold, is released as per Tae-gu fulfilling his end of the deal.

Jae-yoon calmly ambushes the gangsters at the restaurant where she and Tae-gu first met, killing them all. She then retreats to the beach and points the gun to her head. The film fades to black with a loud bang in the background.

Cast

 Uhm Tae-goo as Park Tae-goo
 Jeon Yeo-been as Kim Jae-yeon
 Cha Seung-won as Ma Sang-gil
 Lee Ki-young as Kuto
 Park Ho-san as Yang Do-soo
 Cho Dong-in as Jin-sung

Release
The film premiered at the 77th Venice International Film Festival on September 3, 2020, where it was screened in the "Out of Competition" category.

In mid-October 2020, it was reported that Next Entertainment World might skip the theatrical release and debut the film on Netflix due to the COVID-19 pandemic. In mid-February 2021, it was announced that the film would be released on the streaming platform on April 9.

Reception 
 

Deborah Young of The Hollywood Reporter stated that "Night in Paradise contains a lot of good plotting, several amusing characters and a decent array of exciting action scenes and bloodshed. But it is indulgently long, even within scenes, like the needlessly protracted opening explosion that sets the story in motion." In another mixed review, 
Jonathan Romney of Screen Daily noted that "Addicts of Asian gangster action will relish, but the odd mix of hardcore viscerality and ruminative borderline-sentiment could limit the film's appeal."

James Mottram of the South China Morning Post listed Night in Paradise as one of the 10 best films screened at the 2020 Venice International Film Festival, saying that "there was nothing quite as thrilling as [the film]" and that its "extravagant set pieces and shoot-outs [will] sate any genre hound." Alberto Barbera, director of the Venice Festival, also gave a positive review: "Night in Paradise is one of the best gangster movies coming from South Korean cinema in recent years. Park Hoon-jung is a director that deserves full attention for his ability to combine the writing of original screenplays with the creation of complex characters that are never stereotypical, together with impressive and masterly directorial skills. His name will certainly be heard even more in the future."

Awards and nominations

References

External links
 
 
 

2020 films
2020 crime drama films
2020s Korean-language films
Korean-language Netflix original films
South Korean crime drama films
South Korean gangster films
Films directed by Park Hoon-jung
Films not released in theaters due to the COVID-19 pandemic
Films set in Jeju
Next Entertainment World films